Govhar Bakhshaliyeva (born November 1954, in Baku) is an Azerbaijani academic and politician. She is the director of the Institute of Oriental Studies of the Russian Academy of Sciences.

Academic background and career
After finishing high school in 1972, Bakhshaliyeva entered the Arabic branch of the Oriental Studies faculty of Azerbaijan State University (ASU). In 1977, she graduated from ASU with an honours degree and was employed at the Institute of Oriental Studies of the Russian Academy of Sciences, where she held positions of senior laboratory assistant, junior research officer, and chief of the Arabian Philology department.

Since 1993, Bakhshaliyeva has held the position of deputy director on science of the Institute of Oriental Studies, and since 1997 she has been working as the Institute's director. She is an Academician of the International Academy of Sciences, and is an expert in the field of classic and modern Arabic literature, Arab-speaking Azerbaijan literature, comparative literary criticism, literary communications and source study.

Political career
On November 5, 2000 Bakhshaliyeva was elected a deputy of the Milli Majlis of the Republic of Azerbaijan representing election district No. 57, covering Barda and Aghjabadi. From June 2001 to December 2005, she held a position of Vice Speaker of Milli Majlis. As the Vice Speaker, she was in charge of social legislation. In November 2005, Bakhshaliyeva was again elected a deputy of Milli Majlis. She is a member of the Standing Committee on Science and Education. She is also head of the delegation from the Milli Majlis to the Parliamentary Union of the Organisation of the Islamic Conference. She headed a delegation of Milli Majlis that visited Egypt, Germany, Norway, France, Great Britain, and Italy.

References

External links 
 Organizational Structure Chart from the Institute of Oriental Studies (in Azerbaijani).

1954 births
Living people
Members of the National Assembly (Azerbaijan)
Women members of the National Assembly (Azerbaijan)
Azerbaijani translators
Politicians from Baku
21st-century Azerbaijani women politicians
21st-century Azerbaijani politicians
20th-century translators
21st-century translators
Women orientalists